Passing Stranger is the debut album of British singer-songwriter, Scott Matthews, and was originally released in April 2006.

Passing Stranger or Passing Strangers may also refer to:
 The Passing Stranger, a 1954 British crime film
 "Passing Strangers", a song by Ultravox from the 1980 album Vienna
 "Passing Strangers" (1957 song), written by Mel Mitchell, Stanley Applebaum and Rita Mann

See also
 Passing Strange (disambiguation)